The House of Bernadotte is the royal family of Sweden since its foundation there in 1818. It was also the royal family of Norway between 1818 and 1905. Its founder, Charles XIV John of Sweden, was born in Pau in southern France as Jean Bernadotte. Bernadotte, who had been made a General of Division and Minister of War for his service in the French Army during the French Revolution, and Marshal of the French Empire and Prince of Ponte Corvo under Napoleon, was adopted by the elderly King Charles XIII of Sweden, who had no other heir and whose Holstein-Gottorp branch of the House of Oldenburg thus was soon to be extinct on the Swedish throne.

History of the house 

Following the conclusion of the Finnish War in 1809, Sweden lost possession of Finland, which had constituted roughly the eastern half of the Swedish realm for centuries. Resentment towards King Gustav IV Adolf precipitated an abrupt coup d'état. Gustav Adolf (and his son Gustav) was deposed and his uncle Charles XIII was elected King in his place. However, Charles XIII was 61 years old and prematurely senile. He was also childless; one child had been stillborn and another died after less than a week. It was apparent almost as soon as Charles XIII ascended the throne that the Swedish branch of the House of Holstein-Gottorp would die with him. In 1810 the Riksdag of the Estates, the Swedish parliament, elected a Danish prince, Prince Christian August of Augustenborg, as heir-presumptive to the throne.  He took the name Charles August, but died later that same year.

At this time, Emperor Napoleon I of France controlled much of continental Europe, and some of his client kingdoms were headed by his brothers. The Riksdag decided to choose a king of whom Napoleon would approve. On 21 August 1810, the Riksdag elected Jean Baptiste Jules Bernadotte, a Marshal of France, as heir presumptive to the Swedish throne.

The coat of arms of the House of Bernadotte impales the coat of arms of the House of Vasa (heraldic right) and the coat of arms of Bernadotte as Prince of Pontecorvo (heraldic left). It is visible as an inescutcheon in the Greater Coat of Arms of the Realm.

When elected to be Swedish royalty  the new heir had been called Prince Bernadotte according to the promotions he received from Emperor Napoleon I, culminating in sovereignty over the Principality of Pontecorvo. Some Swedish experts have asserted that all of his male heirs have had the right to use that Italian title, since the Swedish government never made payments promised Charles John to get him to give up his position in Pontecorvo.

Some members of the house who lost their royal status and Swedish titles due to unapproved marriages have also been given the titles Prince Bernadotte and Count of Wisborg in the nobility of other countries.

Bernadotte 

Bernadotte, born in the town of Pau, in the province of Béarn, France, had risen to the rank of general during the French Revolution. In 1798, he married Désirée Clary, whose sister was married to Joseph, Napoleon's elder brother. In 1804, Napoleon promoted Bernadotte to a Marshal of France. Napoleon also granted him the title "Prince of Pontecorvo".

As the Crown Prince of Sweden, he assumed the name Charles John and acted as regent for the remainder of Charles XIII's reign. In 1813, he broke with Napoleon and led Sweden into the anti-Napoleon alliance. When Norway was awarded to Sweden by the Treaty of Kiel, Norway resisted and declared independence, triggering a brief war between Sweden and Norway. The war ended when Bernadotte persuaded Norway to enter into a personal union with Sweden. Instead of being merely a Swedish province, Norway remained an independent kingdom, though sharing a common monarch and foreign policy. Bernadotte reigned as Charles XIV John of Sweden and Charles III John of Norway from 5 February 1818 until his death on 8 March 1844.

The House of Bernadotte reigned in both countries until the dissolution of the union between Norway and Sweden in 1905. Prince Carl of Denmark was then elected as King Haakon VII of Norway. Carl was a grandson of King Charles XV of Sweden and a great-great-grandson of Charles XIV.

French origins 

King Charles John's first known paternal ancestor was Joandou du Poey, who was a shepherd. He married Germaine de Bernadotte in 1615 in the southern French city of Pau and began using her surname. Through her the couple owned a building there called de Bernadotte.

A grandson of theirs, Jean Bernadotte (1649–1698), was a weaver.

Another Jean Bernadotte (1683–1760), his son, was a tailor.

His son Henri Bernadotte (1711–1780) married Jeanne de Saint-Jean (1728–1809) and with her was the father of the future Swedish–Norwegian king. Henri was a local prosecutor, from a family of artisans, who had once been imprisoned for debt. This was a modest family which occupied only one floor of the house in a cross street in a popular and peripheral district of Pau.

Two branches of the French Bernadotte family survive. The elder descends from Andrew (André) Bernadotte, an older granduncle of Carl John's, with descendants today in the general population of France. The younger branch divided in two, one branch descending from the king's older brother John (Jean Évangéliste) Bernadotte (1754–1813), the heads of which were French barons as of 1810 with Louvie Castle in the south of Pau as their seat (branch extinct with the death of Baron Henri Bernadotte in 1966), and the other branch being the Swedish Royal House.

Kings of Sweden 

1818–1844: Charles XIV John
1844–1859: Oscar I
1859–1872: Charles XV
1872–1907: Oscar II
1907–1950: Gustaf V
1950–1973: Gustaf VI Adolf
1973–present: Carl XVI Gustaf

Kings of Norway 
1818–1844: Charles III John
1844–1859: Oscar I
1859–1872: Charles IV
1872–1905: Oscar II

Entire royal house 

This is a list only of the royal house, not of the royal whole family. It excludes in-laws and living persons (2022) who were royal, that is members of the royal house, when they were born but no longer are that today. Royalty currently alive is listed in italics. All are listed primarily as Swedish royalty unless otherwise noted.

King Charles XIV John (1763–1844) of Sweden, Charles III John of Norway
King Oscar I (1799–1859) of Sweden and Norway
King Charles XV (1826–1872) of Sweden, Charles IV of Norway
Prince Charles Oscar of Sweden and Norway (1852–1854), Duke of Södermanland
Queen Louise of Denmark (1851–1926), Princess of Sweden and Norway
Prince Gustav of Sweden and Norway (1827–1852), Duke of Uppland
King Oscar II (1829–1907) of Sweden and Norway
King Gustaf V (1858–1950), né Prince of Sweden and Norway
King Gustaf VI Adolf (1882–1973), né Prince of Sweden and Norway
Prince Gustaf Adolf, Duke of Västerbotten (1906–1947)
King Carl XVI Gustaf (born 1946)
Crown Princess Victoria, Duchess of Västergötland (b. 1977)
Princess Estelle, Duchess of Östergötland (b. 2012)
Prince Oscar, Duke of Skåne (b. 2016)
Prince Carl Philip, Duke of Värmland (b. 1979)
Princess Madeleine, Duchess of Hälsingland and Gästrikland (b. 1982)Princess Birgitta of Sweden and Hohenzollern (b. 1937)Prince Sigvard, Duke of Uppland (1907–2002)
Prince Bertil, Duke of Halland (1912–1997)
Prince Carl Johan, Duke of Dalarna (1916–2012)
Queen Ingrid of Denmark (1910–2000), Princess of Sweden
Prince Wilhelm of Sweden and Norway (1884–1965), Duke of Södermanland
Prince Lennart, Duke of Småland (1909–2004)
Prince Erik of Sweden and Norway (1889–1918), Duke of Västmanland
Prince Oscar of Sweden and Norway (1859–1953), Duke of Gotland
Prince Carl of Sweden and Norway (1861–1951), Duke of Västergötland
Prince Carl, Duke of Östergötland (1911–2003)
Princess Margaretha of Denmark, Norway and Sweden (1899–1977)
Crown Princess Märtha of Norway (1901–1954), née Princess of Sweden and Norway
Queen Astrid of the Belgians (1905–1935), Princess of Sweden
Prince Eugen of Sweden and Norway (1865–1946), Duke of Närke
Prince August of Sweden and Norway (1831–1873), Duke of Dalarna
Princess Eugenie of Sweden and Norway (1830–1889)

 See also 
Guadeloupe Fund
Count of Wisborg
Swedish Act of Succession
Line of succession to the Swedish throne
List of coats of arms of the House of Bernadotte
Bernadotte Armorial

 Notes 

 References 

 Jean-Marc Olivier, "Bernadotte Revisited, or The Complexity of a Long Reign (1810–1844)", in Nordic Historical Review'', number 2, October 2006, pp. 127–137.

External links 

 The Bernadotte dynasty family tree on Kindo
 The Bernadottes in Black and White , photos from an exhibition at the Nationalmuseum, Stockholm.

|-

|-

 
France–Sweden relations
1818 establishments in Sweden